The Alvechurch, ALC, was a British cyclecar manufactured by the Alvechurch Light Car Company in Alvechurch, near Birmingham, England, in 1911. The company was owned by Dunkleys, a pram maker, who also made cars under their own name.

Models
The car was powered by an 8 hp air-cooled Matchless V-twin air-cooled engine with belt drive. The company could not get the drive system to work properly, and only two cars were made.

The car was revived briefly in 1913 as the ALC but was no more successful.

See also
 List of car manufacturers of the United Kingdom

References

Vintage vehicles
Defunct motor vehicle manufacturers of England
Cyclecars
Companies based in Worcestershire
Vehicle manufacturing companies established in 1911